A credit limit is the maximum amount of credit that a financial institution or other lender will extend to a debtor for a particular line of credit (sometimes called a credit line, line of credit, or a tradeline).

This limit is based on a variety of factors ranging from an individual's ability to make interest payments, an organization's cashflow or ability to repay the credit card debt and is an obligation of the consumer to pay just like all other parts of the balance. These factors are often summarized by institutions into a credit score which they use to determine credit eligibility.Credit limit calculation is done to ensure that total receivable exposure is consistent with the financial capabilities of the client and so a credit limit is set for each buyer. If the credit limit is lower than the theoretical credit limit, it is necessary to reduce the outstanding by negotiating better payment terms or by getting payment guarantees

A line of credit that has reached or exceeded its limit is said to be maxed out. While the line of credit is maxed out, it cannot be used for any further activity unless the consumer pays off at least some of the debt to enable it to fall below the limit, the creditor agrees to extend the limit, or the creditor allows one or more additional purchases with the charging of an over-the-limit fee.

References

Credit card terminology